Chongqing Bachuan International High School and Middle School (重庆市巴川国际高级中学校) or Chongqing Bachuan International Math & Science School is an international school in Tongliang District, Chongqing, China. The school shares its campus with Bachuan Middle School, Bachuan High School and the Bachuan Mini program. The international school opened in 2012.

References

External links

 Chongqing Bachuan International High School
 Chongqing Bachuan International High School 

International schools in China
High schools in Chongqing
Educational institutions established in 2012
2012 establishments in China